Frances Elaine Campione is an Ontario woman who murdered her two children in Barrie, Ontario on October 2, 2006. Canadian prosecutors argued that she wanted to get revenge on her ex-husband and was afraid he would receive custody.

Background and crime
Elaine Campione originated from Coles Island, New Brunswick, living there until she moved to Ontario for work reasons at around age 20. She had attended home support classes at a community college for one year. Christie Blatchford of The Globe and Mail wrote that she had "a normal enough childhood". She went to Ontario to work as a nanny and she had other jobs.

Elaine and then-husband Leo Campione, whom she met in 2000, lived in Bradford, Ontario. The two parties divorced and Leo moved out of the house. The victims, Serena and Sophia, were three years and nineteen months old, respectively, at the time of their deaths.

At the time of the incident, Campione lived with her children in the Coulter Glen Apartments in northern Barrie. Blatchford wrote that Leo and Elaine Campione were "engaged in a nasty divorce and custody battle." Leo accused Campione of giving the girls substandard conditions at her apartment and asked the authorities to have more access to the children and the appointment of a children's lawyer about one week before the deaths; Leo stated that there was a "mental health breakdown" on the mother's part.

On October 2, 2006, Campione killed the girls by immersing them in a bathtub in their house, causing them to drown. She filmed a video addressed to her ex-husband with segments before and after her daughters died. Jessica Owen of Village Media described the video as "lengthy". When the drownings were finished, Campione dressed them in pajamas and jewelry, posed them on a bed with objects, and attempted to kill herself.

Prosecution and aftermath
The Crown (Ontario authorities) charged her with two counts of first degree murder. Mary Cremer served as Campione's lawyer.

The trial took seven weeks. Campione's lawyer argued that she was not guilty by reason of insanity; they did not dispute that she killed the girls. On November 15, 2010 she was convicted. The jury decided that she was guilty as she knew murder was wrong, despite any presence of mental illness. Campione was sentenced to life imprisonment with a minimum tariff of 25 years. Leo Campione read a victim impact statement.

Campione filed appeals against her conviction in 2010. In 2015 some of them were denied. In 2019 the Parole Board of Canada allowed her to have escorted absences from prison.

See also
Cases of filicide in Canada:
 Allyson McConnell

Cases of filicide attributed to revenge against an ex-spouse:
 John Battaglia
 Amy Hebert
 Murder of the Kumari-Baker sisters
 Charles Mihayo
 Aaron Schaffhausen

References

2006 in Ontario
2006 murders in Canada
21st-century Canadian criminals
Canadian female criminals
Canadian female murderers
Canadian murderers of children
Canadian people convicted of murder
Canadian prisoners sentenced to life imprisonment
Deaths by drowning
Filicides in Canada
Incidents of violence against girls
Living people
October 2006 crimes
People convicted of murder by Canada
People from Barrie
Place of birth missing (living people)
Prisoners sentenced to life imprisonment by Canada
Year of birth missing (living people)